Etxebarria is a town and municipality located in the province of Biscay, in the autonomous community of Basque Country, northern Spain.

See also
Javier, Etxebarri, Etxeberria, and Chávarri are names with the same Basque etymons.

Notable people
 Yolanda Arrieta

References

External links
 ETXEBARRIA in the Bernardo Estornés Lasa - Auñamendi Encyclopedia (Euskomedia Fundazioa) 

Municipalities in Biscay